Kryg  is a village in the administrative district of Gmina Lipinki, within Gorlice County, Lesser Poland Voivodeship, in southern Poland.

The village has a population of 1,830.

Name of the village 
"Kryg" may come from one of a few roots. In old German, "" means "war", but in old Polish it means jack or device for tensioning crossbows.

Geographical landmarks 
The village is situated at the foot of Dubnakowa Mountain, and Łysula Mountain in the valley of the streams Krygowianka and Królówka.

Architecture and monuments 

In the center of the village is the church, which is a brick nave temple kept in the Baroque style, built between 1932 and 1934.

In the village there are several dozen oil wells, which now are largely liquidated.

See also
 Walddeutsche

References

Kryg